Utö is a small island in the East of Stockholm archipelago, known for its nature.  Utö means "outer island" in Swedish. It is a part of Haninge Municipality.

Geology

Utö and the surrounding islands are unique from a geological point of view and attract many people all-year round. Holmquistite is a kind of mineral that, in Sweden, can be found only on Utö and that is extremely rare globally with small occurrences in several countries in South America and Africa as well as in China, Australia, the USA and parts of Europe. It and many other kinds of minerals and stones are displayed at Utö Gruvmuseum, open daily in summertime in the afternoons.

Geography
Utö has the oldest iron-ore mines in Sweden.

In the southern parts of the island there is a live fire exercise field, Utö skjutfält. The field is administered by 1st Marine Regiment.

A landmark of Utö is its windmill, which is over 200 years old, and from which there is a good view of the bay Mysingen.

At Näsudden there are some remnants from 1719 when the Russians were burning down almost everything in the archipelago from Finland to southern part of Sweden. When they were preparing food, the made a special kind of stove combined with oven, which can be seen at Näsudden and Rånö.

Surrounding islands

The island of Rånö has a minimarket and a small restaurant with entertainment in the summer. There is also camping and cottage rental on Rånö.

On the island of Ålö - connected to Utö with a bridge - there is a popular restaurant with entertainment during the summer. The Båtshaket restaurant serve various fish dishes: cured and smoked salmon, eel and other seafood.

References

External links

 

Geological type localities
Islands of Haninge Municipality
Islands of the Stockholm archipelago